Jatun Wasi (Quechua jatun, hatun big, wasi house, "big house", also spelled Jatun Huasi) is a  mountain in the Andes of Bolivia. Jatun Wasi lies at the Agua Castilla River, east of Yaritayuq.

References 

Mountains of Potosí Department